Frank Bateman Keefe (September 23, 1887 – February 5, 1952) was a Republican member of the United States House of Representatives from Wisconsin.

Born in Winneconne, Wisconsin, he graduated from what is today the University of Wisconsin–Oshkosh in 1906 and was a school teacher in Viroqua, Wisconsin, for two years. He received his law degree from the University of Michigan in 1910 and practiced law in Oshkosh, Wisconsin, later serving as the district attorney for Winnebago County, Wisconsin from 1922 to 1926.

In 1938, he was elected as the representative of Wisconsin's 6th congressional district to the Seventy-sixth United States Congress and reelected to the succeeding five congresses, serving from January 3, 1939, until January 3, 1951. He was on the Joint Committee on the Investigation of the Pearl Harbor Attack and was on the powerful House Appropriations Committee. He retired from the United States Congress after serving six terms. After Congress he resumed his law practice. He died in Neenah, Wisconsin on February 5, 1952. He is interred at Lakeview Memorial Park, in Oshkosh, Wisconsin.

References

External links

University of Wisconsin–Oshkosh alumni
1887 births
1952 deaths
People from Winneconne, Wisconsin
University of Michigan Law School alumni
Republican Party members of the United States House of Representatives from Wisconsin
20th-century American politicians